is a member of the Supreme Court of Japan.

References 

1942 births
Living people
University of Tokyo alumni
Japanese prosecutors
Supreme Court of Japan justices